Maksim Mikhailovich Sidorov (born 11 October 1991) is a Russian football player.

Club career
He made his debut in the Russian Professional Football League for FC Spartak Kostroma on 20 July 2015 in a game against FC Domodedovo Moscow, scoring a goal on his debut in his team's 2-0 victory.

He made his Russian Football National League debut for FC Tekstilshchik Ivanovo on 7 July 2019 in a game against FC Yenisey Krasnoyarsk.

References

External links
 Profile by Russian Professional Football League

1991 births
People from Pereslavl-Zalessky
Sportspeople from Yaroslavl Oblast
Living people
Russian footballers
Association football midfielders
FC Spartak Kostroma players
FC Tekstilshchik Ivanovo players